That's My Boy is a 1951 American semi-musical comedy film directed by Hal Walker and starring the comedy team of Martin and Lewis and marked the first time that Dean Martin and Jerry Lewis actually had "roles" as opposed to previous efforts in which they played an extension of their nightclub act. It was released on May 13, 1951 by Paramount Pictures.

Plot
Junior Jackson is the nerdy son of a former All-American football hero, Jarring Jack Jackson.  His mother is another former star athlete, having been a champion Olympic swimmer.  Junior is something of a disappointment to his father, who has a difficult time understanding how two athletes could produce such a weakling.

Junior is more interested in animal husbandry than sports, but his father has other plans.  In exchange for free tuition to college, Bill Baker makes a deal with Jarring Jack to turn his son into a football star.

Junior somehow makes the team, in addition to falling for beautiful co-ed Terry Howard.  He is too shy to talk to her, however, so she winds up falling for Bill.  Some misadventures follow, including Junior scoring a touchdown—for the opposite team.

To keep up the ruse (and free education), Bill and Terry continue to support Junior and build his new-found confidence. Junior confides to Bill that he intends to marry Terry, so a guilt-ridden Bill gets drunk and makes a scene at Terry's dorm. As a result, he is expelled.

Junior, finding out the truth about Bill and Terry, is determined to make things right.  He goes on to win the big game single-handedly and lives up to his father's expectations, who proudly exclaims, "That's my boy!"

Cast

Dean Martin as Bill Baker
Jerry Lewis as 'Junior' Jackson
Ruth Hussey as Ann Jackson
Eddie Mayehoff as Jarring Jack Jackson
Marion Marshall as Terry Howard
Polly Bergen as Betty "Babs"  Hunter
Hugh Sanders as Coach Wheeler
John McIntire as Dr. Benjamin Green
Francis Pierlot as Henry Baker
Lillian Randolph as May the Maid
Selmer Jackson as Doc Hunter (as Selmar Jackson)
Tom Harmon as himself (Football Announcer)
Gregg Palmer as Student (as Palmer Lee)
Hazel Boyne as Housemother (billed as Hazel "Sonny" Boyne)
Frank Gifford as 'Junior' Jackson - Football Sequences 
Don Haggerty as Tom, Masseur

Songs

 Ballin' the Jack - Dean Martin, Polly Bergen, and Ensemble
 I'm in the Mood for Love - Dean Martin

Production
That's My Boy was filmed from December 6, 1950 through January 10, 1951. Location scenes were at Occidental College in northeast Los Angeles.

Home media
The film was included on an eight-film DVD set, the Dean Martin and Jerry Lewis Collection: Volume One, released on October 31, 2006.

In other media

Television
A single-season CBS television series based on this film aired from 1954-1955, with Mayehoff reprising his role as Jarring Jack Jackson. Gil Stratton played "Junior" Jackson, and Rochelle Hudson was cast as the wife and mother, Alice Jackson.

Comic book
 Eastern Color Movie Love #12 (December 1951)

References

External links

1951 films
1950s sports comedy films
American sports comedy films
American football films
American black-and-white films
1950s English-language films
Films directed by Hal Walker
Films produced by Hal B. Wallis
Films set in universities and colleges
Paramount Pictures films
Films adapted into comics
1951 comedy films
1950s American films